The North Burial Ground is a  cemetery in Providence, Rhode Island dating to 1700, the first public cemetery in Providence.  It is located north of downtown Providence, bounded by North Main Street, Branch Avenue, the Moshassuck River, and Cemetery Street.  Its main entrance is at the junction of Branch and North Main. The burial ground is one of the larger municipal cemeteries in Southern New England, and it accepts 220 to 225 burials per year.

History
From the time of its founding by Roger Williams in 1636, Rhode Island had strict separation of religious and government institutions. Therefore, Providence had no state churches with adjacent public burial grounds, as most New England towns had. Instead, townspeople buried their dead in family plots on individual farms.

In 1700, a town vote was held to establish a municipal cemetery. This cemetery was to be open to the deceased of all faiths, from millionaires to paupers, and even emancipated slaves. 45 acres were set aside; 10 acres were to be used for a cemetery, the remainder for a town common and militia training ground. However, the first official burial didn't take place until one Samuel Whipple was buried here in 1710/11. There were only about one or two burials per year until 1736, when 14 people were buried.

By the mid-1800s, under the influence of the Rural Cemetery Movement, cemeteries generally became viewed as a place for the general public to enjoy refined outdoor recreation. In Providence, the North Burial Ground was further landscaped. More land was added, along with curving roads and trees, to make the grounds more attractive to the living.

Notable interments
See also: 

North Burial Ground has the burials of many notable Rhode Island residents, including governors, members of Congress, soldiers, millionaires, emancipated slaves, and literary figures:

 Daniel Abbott, deputy governor of Rhode Island colony
 Philip Allen, Governor of Rhode Island and U.S. Senator
 Zachariah Allen, prominent Providence mill owner and civic leader
 William B. Avery, Medal of Honor recipient
 Edward Mitchell Bannister, Canadian African-American painter
 Chad Brown, early pastor of the First Baptist Church in America, progenitor of Brown family
 John Brown, merchant, U.S. Representative, slave trader, co-founder of Brown University
 John Nicholas Brown II, socialite and philanthropist
 Nicholas Brown, Jr., philanthropist and namesake of Brown University
 Kady Brownell, Civil War veteran
 Tristam Burgess, U.S. representative
 Esek Hopkins, The only chief of the Continental Navy during the Revolutionary War
 Jonathan Chace, U.S. senator
 John Hopkins Clark, U.S. senator
 Nicholas Cooke, governor of colony and state of Rhode Island during American Revolutionary War
 Fred Corey, Major League Baseball player
 Charles Dow, journalist, co-founder of Dow Jones & Company and founder of The Wall Street Journal
 Samuel Eddy, U.S. representative and Chief Justice of the Rhode Island Supreme Court.
 Arthur Fenner, Governor of Rhode Island from 1790 to 1805.
 James Fenner, U.S. senator from 1805 to 1807, Rhode Island governor from 1807 to 1811, 1824 to 1831 and 1843 to 1845
 Sam Walter Foss, librarian, poet
 John Brown Francis, governor and U.S. senator
 William Goddard (U.S. patriot/publisher), American Revolutionary War printer
 Stephen Hopkins, colonial governor, founding father, signatory of the Declaration of Independence
 Jeremiah Brown Howell, U.S. senator
 Richard Jackson, U.S. representative
 Horace Mann, educator, U.S. representative, and first president of Antioch College
 James Manning, delegate to the Confederation Congress
 Albert Martin (soldier) (memorial), soldier, only Rhode Islander to have fought at the Battle of the Alamo.
 Charles J. Martin, artist and arts instructor
 James B. Mason, U.S. representative
 Peter Mawney, colonel of Providence militia
 Augustus S. Miller (1847–1905), Mayor of Providence 1903–1905.
 Annie Smith Peck, pioneering woman mountaineer
 Saunders Pitman, silversmith.
 Darius Sessions, deputy governor of Rhode Island colony
 James F. Simmons, U.S. senator
 Henry J. Steere, philanthropist and manufacturer
 Joseph L. Tillinghast, U.S. representative
 Sarah Helen Whitman, poet, essayist, and a romantic interest of Edgar Allan Poe

Images

See also
 National Register of Historic Places listings in Providence, Rhode Island

Further reading
 "The Early Records of the Town of Providence, Volume 18" by Snow & Farnham Company, 1904.

References

External links
 
 
 

1700 establishments in Rhode Island
Buildings and structures in Providence, Rhode Island
Cemeteries in Rhode Island
Cemeteries on the National Register of Historic Places in Rhode Island
National Register of Historic Places in Providence, Rhode Island